Steam Navigation Companies became widespread during the 19th century after the development of steam-powered vessels, both steamboats, which were generally used on lakes and rivers, and ocean-faring steamships. Companies that share the name Steam Navigation Company include the following, listed by their country of ownership.

Australia
 Australasian Steam Navigation Company (1839–1887)
 Australian United Steam Navigation Company (1887–1961), formed by the merger of the Australasian Steam Navigation Company and the Queensland Steam Shipping Company
 Clarence, Richmond & Macleay River Steam Navigation Company, 1888 name of the North Coast Steam Navigation Company
 Grafton Steam Navigation Company, 1855 name of the North Coast Steam Navigation Company
 Hunter River Steam Navigation Company, 1839 name of the Australasian Steam Navigation Company
 Illawarra Steam Navigation Company (1858–early 1950s), south coast of New South Wales
 Launceston & Melbourne Steam Navigation Company, taken over by the Tasmanian Steam Navigation Company in 1865
 North Coast Steam Navigation Company (1855–1954)
 River Murray Steam Navigation Company (charter received in 1854)
 Tasmanian Steam Navigation Company (1853–1922), between Tasmania, the Australian Mainland, and New Zealand

India
 Bombay Coast and River Steam Navigation Company ( 1860s), between Bombay and other Indian ports
 Bombay Steam Navigation Company (late 19th century–1952), passenger ferry and cargo services along the Konkan coast of India; amalgamated with Scindia Steam Navigation Company Ltd.
 Scindia Steam Navigation Company Ltd. (founded in 1919), ceased shipping in 1997
 Shri Ambica Steam Navigation Company (1942–before 1980), western coast of India
 Swadeshi Steam Navigation Company (founded in 1906), between Tuticorin and Colombo

United Kingdom
 Atlantic Steam Navigation Company (1934–1971), roll-on roll-off ferry service
 Barrow Steam Navigation Company, acquired by the Midland Railway in 1907
 Bristol General Steam Navigation Company (1821–1980), between Bristol and ports in southern Ireland
 British India Steam Navigation Company (1862–1972), one of the largest shipowners of all time with; more than 500 ships; absorbed into P&O
 Calcutta and Burmah Steam Navigation Company (1856–1862), began as a mail carrier between Calcutta, India, and Rangoon, Burma; renamed British-India Steam Navigation Company
 Castletown Steam Navigation Company (1854–1858), between Isle of Man and England
 Eastern Steam Navigation Company (1851– 1858)
 General Steam Navigation Company (GSNC) (1824–1872), specialized in short sea shipping; acquired by P&O
 Indo-China Steam Navigation Company Ltd. (ICSNC) (1873–1974), established as a subsidiary of Hong Kong-based Jardine
 Neptune Steam Navigation Company, see  SS Trondhjemsfjord
 North of Scotland, Orkney & Shetland Steam Navigation Company or The North Company (founded in 1875), part of NorthLink Ferries
 North Lancashire Steam Navigation Company (1843–1870), between Fleetwood and, principally, Belfast, Northern Ireland
 Orient Steam Navigation Company or Orient Line (1878–1966), absorbed into P&O
 Pacific Steam Navigation Company (1838– 1965), operated on the Pacific coast of South America
 Peninsular and Oriental Steam Navigation Company (P&O) (founded 1822), originally service between London, Spain and Portugal
 White Star Line or Oceanic Steam Navigation Company (1845–1934), merged with Cunard Line
 Scilly Isles Steam Navigation Company (1858–1872), between Cornwall and the Isles of Scilly
 Ullswater Steam Navigation Company (founded 1855), passenger transportation on Ullswater, English Lake District

United States
 British and American Steam Navigation Company (1839–1841), London-New York service
 California Steam Navigation Company (1854–1871), transporta along the coast and inland waters of California, Oregon, and British Columbia
 Inter-Island Steam Navigation Company (1883–1947), passenger and cargo service between the Hawaiian Islands
 Ocean Steam Navigation Company (1847–1857), oceanic mail transportation for the U.S. government
 Oregon Steam Navigation Company (founded 1860), transport between San Francisco and ports along the Columbia River
 Colorado Steam Navigation Company (1867—1877), transport on the Colorado River, sold to the Southern Pacific Company
 Willamette Steam Navigation Company (1865–1866), transport on the Willamette River

Other countries
 China Merchants' Steam Navigation Company (founded 1872)
 General Steam Navigation Company of Greece (1939–1975), passenger ship line
 Russian Steam Navigation and Trading Company (1856–1918)